Solar Attack (also called Solar Strike) is a 2006 television film by CineTel Films and Lions Gate Entertainment, starring Mark Dacascos, Joanne Kelly and Louis Gossett Jr.

Solar Attack concerns large coronal mass ejections (CMEs) that cause the Earth's atmosphere to burn, potentially suffocating all life on Earth. All of this happens during a time of political tension between the United States and Russia. Disaster is eventually averted by the detonation of nuclear missiles at the poles, releasing vapor that extinguishes the burning methane caused by the CMEs.

Plot
While a solar probe operated by the fictional Solar and Near Earth Laboratory (SNEL) is obtaining data, a large CME or solar flare destroys the probe. A crewed spacecraft, Galileo, is caught in the CME and destroyed; the tragedy is blamed on defective Russian equipment. CMEs knock satellites out of orbit, turning them into deadly meteors, and a CME hits New Zealand, destroying it and turning it into a huge mass of molten rock.

After a multi-millionaire, Lucas Foster (Mark Dacascos), funds a program to fight global warming, it is discovered that the Earth's atmosphere is now 5 percent methane. Multiple CMEs are bound to hit the Earth, ignite the methane, and suffocate every living thing on Earth. Foster, who is also a scientist, tries to convince his skeptical colleagues. The government officials and fellow scientist Joanna Parks (Joanne Kelly), his ex-wife, do not believe Foster either.

As the CMEs strike, it is determined that 25-megaton nuclear missiles fired at the North Pole will release vapor that will extinguish the methane flares. Fortunately, Foster knows a Russian Navy submarine captain who reluctantly lets him board his submarine. Foster explains that although satellite communication has been disabled, the submarine can communicate via a transatlantic telegraph cable located at a depth of 800 m. The sub is designed to dive to 700m, but the captain tells his reluctant lieutenant to dive to 800 m nevertheless. The submarine survives the dive with minor damage. Communication between the captain and the Russian President results in the latter, who has been informed of the situation by U.S. President Ryan Gordon (Louis Gossett Jr.), telling the captain to go ahead with the plan.

Meanwhile, the Russian submarine has detected a U.S. Navy submarine. Before the Russian missiles can be launched, a lieutenant threatens the captain at gunpoint, but Foster wrestles the gun away. The Russian submarine is detected by the Americans, who threaten to attack if it does not surrender. The Russian captain launches the missiles anyway, and the American submarine fires two torpedoes. The Russian submarine releases countermeasures that destroy the torpedoes, but it still suffers damage. Foster manages to contact the American sub over short-wave radio and convince them to stand down in exchange for the Russians surrender, though Foster states that the surrender is a simple formality. The missiles arrive at the North Pole and the Earth is saved. Foster is returned to the US aboard the American sub where he reunites with Joanna and his friend Jim.

Cast

 Mark Dacascos as Dr. Lucas Foster
 Joanne Kelly as Dr. Joanna Parks
 Kevin Jubinville as Brad Stamp
 Sugith Varughese as Patel
 Craig Eldridge as Jim Leeburg
 Tim Post as Joe Aguilar
 Stephen McHattie as Admiral Lawrence
 Conrad Coates as Colonel Alby
 Louis Gossett Jr. as President Ryan Gordon
 Damir Andrei as President Yuri Ilyushin
 Bill Lake as Captain Misha Gregorovitch
 Genādijs Dolganovs as Lt. Troiska
 Romas Stanulis as Russian Crew Member
 Ronn Sarosiak as Captain Wade	
 Duane Murray as Lt. Copeland
 Jason Knight as Delta Pilot	
 Bill Hall as Reporter
 Gordon Masten as Hot Dog Man
 Neil Crone as Security Guard

Production
Solar Attack under its original working title, Solar Strike, was shot in Hamilton, Ontario and Toronto, Ontario, Canada.  is seen in the last scene of the film, standing in for a U.S. Navy destroyer.

See also
Solar Crisis
Sunshine

References
Notes

External links
 
 
 

2000s science fiction thriller films
2006 television films
2006 films
Canadian disaster films
Canadian science fiction thriller films
CineTel Films films
English-language Canadian films
Films about fictional presidents of the United States
Films set in California
Films set in Detroit
Films set in Iceland
Films set in Moscow
Films set in New Zealand
Films set in New York (state)
Films set in Shanghai
Films set in Washington, D.C.
Films set in the Arctic
Films set in the Atlantic Ocean
Films set in the White House
Films shot in Hamilton, Ontario
Canadian horror television films
Disaster television films
Films about impact events
Moscow Kremlin in fiction
Films directed by Paul Ziller
2000s American films
2000s Canadian films
2000s English-language films